Josip Glasnović (born 7 May 1983) is a Croatian sports shooter who competes in shotgun events. His biggest success was the gold medal in trap at the 2016 Summer Olympics.

He reached the trap final at the 2008 Summer Olympic Games in Beijing, where he finished 5th.

He also won a gold medal in team trap along with his national team teammates, his brother Anton Glasnović and Giovanni Cernogoraz at the 2012 European Shotgun Championships in Larnaca.

In the 2016 Summer Olympics, he won a gold medal in trap, beating Giovanni Pellielo in the final round.

Personal life 
Glasnović is of Kosovo Croat descent. He is married to Ana Došen Glasnović and they have two children together. He is a devout Roman Catholic.

Olympic results

Orders
 Order of Danica Hrvatska with face of Franjo Bučar – 2016

References

External links
Profile at the International Shooting Sport Federation website

1983 births
Living people
Croatian people of Kosovan descent
Croatian male sport shooters
Olympic shooters of Croatia
Olympic medalists in shooting
Shooters at the 2008 Summer Olympics
Trap and double trap shooters
Sportspeople from Zagreb
European Games competitors for Croatia
Shooters at the 2015 European Games
Shooters at the 2016 Summer Olympics
Medalists at the 2016 Summer Olympics
Olympic gold medalists for Croatia
Shooters at the 2020 Summer Olympics